Sung-Wei Tseng(born December 28, 1984 in Taitung County, Republic of China (Taiwan), is a Taiwanese professional baseball player.

A pitcher, he plays minor league baseball in the United States for the Cleveland Indians organization.  In 2008, he played for the Akron Aeros and Kinston Indians.

Tseng also plays for the Chinese Taipei baseball team in the 2009 World Baseball Classic.

External links 
TheBaseballCube.com profile

1984 births
Living people
2009 World Baseball Classic players
Kinston Indians players
Akron Aeros players
Arizona League Indians players
Brother Elephants players
People from Taitung County
Asian Games medalists in baseball
Baseball players at the 2006 Asian Games
Asian Games gold medalists for Chinese Taipei
Medalists at the 2006 Asian Games